The Electoral district of Counties of St Vincent and Auckland was an electorate of the partially elected New South Wales Legislative Council, created for the first elections for the Council in 1843. The electoral district consisted of the two south coast counties of St Vincent and Auckland, extending from Jervis Bay south to Eden and west to Braidwood. Polling took place at Jervis Bay, Ulladulla, Braidwood, Broulee and Eden. The district was abolished with the expansion of the Council in 1851. St Vincent was combined with Murray to the west as the Counties of Murray and St Vincent while Auckland became part of the Pastoral District of Maneroo.

Members

Election results

1843

1845
Coghill resigned in March 1845.

1848

1849
Hill resigned in May 1849. Both Arthur Holroyd and Edward Flood advertised that they would be standing, however neither were nominated.

See also
Members of the New South Wales Legislative Council, 1843–1851

References

Former electoral districts of New South Wales Legislative Council
1843 establishments in Australia
1851 disestablishments in Australia